Deh Tall (also Romanized as Deh Tol) is a village in Barez Rural District, Manj District, Lordegan County, Chaharmahal and Bakhtiari Province, Iran. At the 2006 census, its population was 353, in 69 families.

References 

Populated places in Lordegan County